Masked Intruder is an anonymous American punk rock band from Madison, Wisconsin, United States. 

The members of the band are Intruder Yellow (bass, backing vocals), Intruder Green (rhythm guitar, backing vocals), Intruder Red (drums, backing vocals), and Intruder Blue (lead vocals, lead guitar). The band claims Intruder Yellow is currently in jail. They are known for wearing different colored ski masks and shoes on stage, using color-coded instruments, and never revealing their identities in publicity photos. They are also known for their early pop punk sound with their fast-paced songs, usually about love.  Their self-titled debut album was released by Red Scare in 2012 and then re-released by Fat Wreck Chords in 2013. When live and sometimes in videos, Masked Intruder is watched by Officer Bradford, a cop who acts as a hypeman for the band and a plot device for the band's music videos.

History

Formation and Masked Intruder (2010-2013)
Intruder Blue and Intruder Green claim to have met and formed the band while in jail.
The band has claimed their first show was at Woof's in their hometown of Madison, Wisconsin.

M.I. era (2014-2018)

III and recent activity (2019-present)
Where they go????

Band members

Current members 
 Intruder Blue - lead vocals, lead guitar 
 Intruder Green  - rhythm guitar, backing vocals 
 Intruder Red  - drums, backing vocals

Former members 
 Intruder Yellow  - bass, backing vocals

Touring members 
 Officer Bradford  - hypeman 
 Intruder Purple - bass, backing vocals

Timeline

Discography

Studio albums
 Masked Intruder (2012, Red Scare Industries)
Re-released on Fat Wreck Chords in 2013
 M.I. (2014, Fat Wreck Chords)
III (2019, Pure Noise Records)

Extended plays
 Incriminating Evidence: 2011 Demos (2011, self-released)
 Re-released on Red Scare Industries
 First Offence (2012, Red Scare Industries, Hang Up Records)
 Masked Intruder/The Turkletons (2012, Hang Up Records, split with The Turkletons)
 The Wedding 7" (2013, Solidarity Recordings, split with Dan Vapid and the Cheats)
 Red Scare Across America (2013, Red Scare Industries, split with Elway and Sam Russo)
 Under the Mistletoe 7" (2013, Fat Wreck Chords: 7", Red Scare Industries: digital format)
 Love and Other Crimes (2016, Pure Noise Records)

Singles

Compilation albums

Compilation appearances
 Our Lips Are Sealed: A Tribute to the Go Go's (2013, Solidarity Recordings)
Features the non-album track "We Got the Beat"
 Red Scare Industries: 10 Years of Your Dumb Bullshit (2014, Red Scare Records)
Features the track "I Don't Mind"
 Fat Music Vol. 8 Going Nowhere Fat (2015, Fat Wreck Chords)
Features the track "The Most Beautiful Girl"

Music videos
 "I Don't Wanna Be Alone Tonight" (2013)
 "Crime Spree" (2014)
 "The Most Beautiful Girl" (2014, Lyric Video)
 "Beyond a Shadow of a Doubt" (2016)
 "First Star Tonight" (2017)
 "No Case" (2019)
 "All of My Love" (2019)

Filmography

References

External links

 
 
 
 

Musical groups from Wisconsin
American pop punk groups
Punk rock groups from Wisconsin
Alternative rock groups from Wisconsin
Fat Wreck Chords artists
Pure Noise Records artists
Unidentified people
Masked musicians
Musical groups established in 2010
2010 establishments in Wisconsin
Bands with fictional stage personas